Hartzell Propeller is an American manufacturer that was founded in 1917 by Robert N. Hartzell as the Hartzell Walnut Propeller Company. It produces composite and aluminum propellers for certified, homebuilt, and ultralight aircraft. The company is headquartered in Piqua, Ohio.

Hartzell also produces spinners, governors, ice protection systems, and other propeller controls.

History

Robert Hartzell grew up in the village of Oakwood, Ohio, just a block from Hawthorn Hill, where Orville Wright lived. From the 1890s until the late 1910s, Hartzell's father and grandfather operated a sawmill and lumber supply company in Greenville, Ohio (later moved to Piqua, Ohio) that also manufactured items such as wagons and gun stocks for World War I. On the side, Robert owned a small airplane and did maintenance on it as a young man. In 1917, Orville Wright suggested that Hartzell use his walnut trees to manufacture an aircraft propeller for his plane and others. Robert Hartzell founded the Hartzell Walnut Propeller Company in Piqua that year, and the company provided "Liberty" aircraft propellers for World War I warplanes.

After the war, Hartzell Propeller built its own airplanes, including the FC-1 (the first aircraft made entirely of plywood).  The FC-1 took first place in the Flying Club of St. Louis Trophy Race at the 1923 International Air Meet. An alteration to the wings resulted in the improved FC-2 model, which won competing over aircraft from the Waco Aircraft Company and the Curtiss Aeroplane and Motor Company at the 1924 International Air Races in Dayton, Ohio. Hartzell stopped producing aircraft to avoid competing with its own propeller customers. In 1926, Hartzell began building propellers for the Aeronca C-2.

During World War II the company produced metal propellers for Hamilton-Standard. After the war, Hartzell produced the first composite propellers for the Republic RC-3 Seabee. Hartzell began making aluminum propellers in 1948 and developed the first full-feathering propellers for a light twin-engine aircraft in the 1950s. These were used in the Aero Commander, Piper Apache, Cessna 310, and Beech Twin Bonanza.

Hartzell introduced a turboprop propeller in 1961 and, in 1975, certified a 5-bladed propeller for the Shorts 330. In 1978, the company produced a composite aramid fiber propeller for the CASA 212. In 1989, Hartzell produced sixteen-foot propellers for the Boeing Condor, another record-breaking aircraft.

Hartzell introduced "Top-Prop" replacement propellers for piston-engine aircraft, in 1991, and sold 20,000 Top-Prop conversion kits from 1991 to 2013.

In 1994, the company held the first Friends of Hartzell Air Show in Piqua, Ohio. for which Hartzell developed its first aerobatic system. In 2013, the Red Bull Air Race World Championship chose Hartzell to provide 3-blade composite propellers, carbon-fiber composite spinners, and governors to race teams. In 2006, the FAA granted Hartzell the first certification for an Advanced Structural Composite (ASC II) propeller for general aviation.

In July 2021, Hartzell Propeller purchased the assets of Tanis Aircraft Products, a company that makes aircraft engine pre-heat systems. Tanis President and CEO Douglas Evink became Hartzell Propeller's vice president of sales for the new Tanis business unit, and the Tanis operations remained near Anoka County Airport, outside Minneapolis, Minnesota.

See also
List of aircraft propeller manufacturers

References

External links 

Aerospace companies of the United States
Aircraft propeller manufacturers
Manufacturing companies based in Ohio
Manufacturing companies established in 1917